A missile strike on two residential buildings in Chasiv Yar was carried out by the Russian army at 21:17 local time on 9 July 2022, during the war between Russia and Ukraine. At least 48 people were killed. Due to the impact, a five-story residential building partially collapsed. Two entrances were completely destroyed.

Course of events

The strike was alleged, including by Donetsk Oblast governor Pavlo Kyrylenko, to have been performed with "Uragan", a self-propelled 220 mm multiple rocket launcher designed in the Soviet Union. The Russian Defense Ministry claimed that they destroyed a "temporary deployment point” of a Ukrainian territorial defence unit.

As of 10 July, 67 rescue workers of the State Emergency Service of Ukraine were trying to help the victims and more than 20 people were still feared to be trapped under the rubble.

Rescue and search operations continued until the morning of July 14, 2022. Rescuers dismantled about 525 tons of destroyed elements of the building. 323 employees of the State Emergency Service and 9 units of equipment were involved.

Victims
As of 13 July, 48 dead were found under the rubble of the building, and nine wounded were rescued as of 12 July. A local resident told the New York Times that there were 10 elderly civilians in the buildings, but that members of the military had come to lodge there two days earlier. He had tried to persuade his grandmother to move to a safe place, but she had refused. Two soldiers who probably took turns sleeping in the building after being on duty were among the dead.

At least eleven of the victims were soldiers originally from Ternopil Oblast.

Reactions
Andriy Yermak, the chief of staff to Ukraine's president, said that the strike was "another terrorist attack" and that Russia should be designated a "state sponsor of terrorism" as a result. Russian military spokesman Igor Konashenkov stated that Russia had killed "over 300 nationalists" in an attack on Chasiv Yar, but did not specify whether or not they were referring to the July airstrike or an earlier attack.

References

External links 
 

2020s building bombings
Attacks on buildings and structures in 2022
Attacks on buildings and structures in Ukraine
Chasiv Yar
Building bombings in Europe
July 2022 crimes in Europe
July 2022 events in Ukraine
Airstrikes during the 2022 Russian invasion of Ukraine